Bebo was an American social networking website.

Bebo  may also refer to:

People
 Károly Bebo (–1779), 18th-century Hungarian sculptor, builder and decorator
 Kareena Kapoor (also Bebo; born 1980), Indian actress
 Bebo Norman (born 1973), former contemporary Christian musician
 Bebo Valdés (1918–2013), Cuban pianist, bandleader, composer and arranger

Other
 Bebo, a character from the Indian television drama-series Sabki Laadli Bebo
 Bebo, a recurring character on the American sitcom Mork & Mindy
 The Bebos, a drug-smuggling gang led by Howard Mason
 Bebo (song), a song by Romeo Santos
 Bebo, a song by Burna Boy from Twice as Tall

See also
 Bebo's Girl (disambiguation)